Sonali Dev is an Indian American writer of contemporary romance novels.

Life 
Dev was born in around 1972. She spent the beginning of her life on the west coast of India in the city of Mumbai. She moved to the United States around 2006 after marrying her husband, Manoj Thatte, and she has expressed great satisfaction with this arranged union.

Career 
While in Mumbai, Dev wrote some Bollywood scripts but these did not progress from the development phase. She began writing romance genre novels in 2010, inspired after reading the work of Catherine Coulter and realising the genre's similarity to Bollywood movie themes.
Dev experienced racial discrimination from multiple publishing companies because the protagonists in her novels are of Indian descent, and she is writing these diverse characters in the romance genre.

A Bollywood Affair, Dev's first novel, was published in 2014 by Kensington Publishing Company and was shortlisted for the RITA Award by the Romance Writers of America.

In 2018, Dev provided the Librarian's Day keynote speech at the annual Romance Writers of America (RWA) conference.

As of 2019, Dev resided in Naperville, Illinois, and has participated in multiple local events put on by the town.

Themes 
Dev commonly blends American and Indian cultures in her works, often with an emphasis on the popular Bollywood style. Her characters come from a variety of backgrounds and fall all along the spectrum of wealth. Some of her characters experience discrimination due to their race, gender, and culture.

In Dev's first published novel, she addresses the issue of child marriage. Dev has been clear that in her opinion, that there is a difference between child marriages and arranged marriages.

Characters within Dev's novels often deal with the pressures of family and tradition, as well as how society can react to people with mental illness and fame.

Her novel, Pride, Prejudice, and Other Flavors, is a mash up of Dev's normal Bollywood themes and Jane Austen's classic novel Pride and Prejudice.

Selected works

Awards 
A Bollywood Affair - 2015 The Reading List (Reference and User Services Association)

References 

1972 births
Living people
American people of Indian descent
American writers
Women romantic fiction writers
American women novelists
21st-century American women writers